Arte S is a residential complex located in Gelugor, a suburb south of George Town, Penang, Malaysia. It is the 15th tallest building in Malaysia outside of Kuala Lumpur, after Royal Strand Tower 2.

A notable sight are two pod-like structures named "PODs", each 4-stories tall in height. They occupy the sky-garden of the 35th to the 39th floor of Tower B. Meant for recreational and entertainment purposes, it could accommodate up to 60 people at once.

Development started in 2013 by Nusmetro (later named as Arte Corp), a Malaysian property and development firm. The design of the structure was undertaken by SPARK, an architectural firm based in London, Shanghai and Singapore.  Construction started in 2015, with a scheduled completion date of October 2017. The structure later topped-out in 2017, before full completion in May 2018.

The building has been notable for its unusual look among locals, with "rotating-fin-geometries", creating unique observation angles on each floor. The design was inspired by the geography of Penang Island, with the towers sitting between the island's undulating hills and the Penang Strait nearby. The design was praised as being innovative among critics, in which Nusmetro won the "Best Apartment of the Year" award in the 13th Kinpan Awards for this project.

See also 
List of tallest buildings in George Town

References

External links 
 Arte S

Buildings and structures in George Town, Penang
Residential skyscrapers in Malaysia
Twin towers
Residential buildings completed in 2018